Sorana Cîrstea and Anastasia Pavlyuchenkova were the defending champions. Both were present that year, but competed with different partners. 
Cirstea partnered with Maria Kirilenko, but lost in the final to Alisa Kleybanova and Ekaterina Makarova, 6–3, 2–6, 10–8. 
Pavlyuchenkova partnered with Aravane Rezaï, but were forced to concede to a walkover before the first round match against Polona Hercog and Ioana Raluca Olaru.

Seeds

  Sorana Cîrstea /  Maria Kirilenko (final)
  Alisa Kleybanova /  Ekaterina Makarova (champions)
  Petra Cetkovská /  Lucie Hradecká  (first round)
  Maria Kondratieva /  Sophie Lefèvre (semifinals)

Draw

Finals

External links
 Draw

Grand Prix SAR La Princesse Lalla Meryem - Doubles
Morocco Open
2009 in Moroccan tennis